Trevignano Romano is a small town and comune in the Metropolitan City of Rome, Lazio, central Italy. With a population of about 5,000, it is located on the volcanic Lake Bracciano.

History

The presence of people in the area dates back to the Paleolithic, as shown by the La Marmotta settlement in the nearby Anguillara Sabazia. 
Etruscans were settled in the area for a long while: tombs from the 8th - 6th centuries BC have been found in the hills north of Trevignano; well-preserved artifacts from two of these tombs are on display at the local Roman Etruscan Museum. In 387 BC when Veii fell, the Romans conquered the whole area and eventually built many villas on the lakeshore, some now below water. The magnificent Imperial thermal spa and villa in Vicarello and the Trajan Aqueduct were built later.

During the Medieval Age, Trevignano was owned by the Prefetti di Vico and the Orsini and defended by a fortress, build on the top of the city and destroyed during the war between the Borgia and the Orsini Family. Later the city became property of some important Roman families: Odescalchi , Del Grillo, Cybo Malaspina, Conti, Torlonia, Ginori Conti and Del Drago.

The castle was erected around 1200 by order of Pope Innocent III, and later reinforced by the Orsini. It once had three layers of massive walls, but the siege of Cesare Borgia in 1497 and subsequent earthquakes have reduced the structures to a state of poor-repair.

References

External links
Official website

Cities and towns in Lazio
Castles in Italy